The 2022 Asian Men's Junior Handball Championship will be the 17th edition of the championship scheduled to be held from 15 to 24 July 2022 in Isa Town, Bahrain under the aegis of Asian Handball Federation (AHF). It will be the second time in history that the championship will be organised by the Bahrain Handball Federation (BHF). It also acts as a qualification tournament for the 2023 Men's Junior World Handball Championship, with top four teams from the championship directly qualifying for the event to be jointly hosted by Germany and Greece.

Draw
The draw was held on 8 July 2022 at the Millennium Hotel and Convention Centre, Salmiya, Kuwait.

Preliminary round
All times are local (UTC+3).

Group A

Group B

Knockout stage

Bracket

5–8th place semifinals

Semifinals

Seventh place game

Fifth place game

Third place game

Final

Final standings

References

External links
 Official Website

International handball competitions hosted by Bahrain
Asia
Asian Handball Championships
2022 in Bahraini sport
Asian Men's Junior Handball Championship
Asian Men's Junior Handball Championship